Endonura is a genus of springtails in the family Neanuridae. There are at least 40 described species in Endonura.

Species
These 41 species belong to the genus Endonura:

 Endonura alavensis Pozo & Simon, 1981 g
 Endonura arbasensis Deharveng, 1979 g
 Endonura asiatica g
 Endonura baculifer Deharveng, 1979 g
 Endonura caeca Gisin, 1963 g
 Endonura cantabrica Deharveng, 1979 g
 Endonura centaurea Cassagnau & Peja, 1979 g
 Endonura ceratolabralis Cassagnau, 1979 g
 Endonura colorata (da Gama, 1964) g
 Endonura cretensis (Ellis, 1976) g
 Endonura dalensi Deharveng, 1979 g
 Endonura deharvengi Cassagnau & Peja, 1979 g
 Endonura dentifera g
 Endonura dichaeta Cassagnau, 1979 g
 Endonura dudichi Loksa, 1967 g
 Endonura gladiolifer (Cassagnau, 1954) g
 Endonura gracilirostris g
 Endonura granulata (Cassagnau & Delamare, 1955) g
 Endonura ichnusae Dallai, 1983 g
 Endonura immaculata Deharveng, 1980 g
 Endonura incolorata Stach, 1951 g
 Endonura levantica g
 Endonura longirostris Cassagnau, 1979 g
 Endonura ludovicae (Denis, 1948) g
 Endonura lusatica (Dunger, 1966) g
 Endonura occidentalis Deharveng, 1979 g
 Endonura paracentaurea Cassagnau, 1979 g
 Endonura pejai Deharveng, 1980 g
 Endonura persica Cassagnau, 1979 g
 Endonura poinsotae Deharveng, 1980 g
 Endonura portucalensis (da Gama, 1964) g
 Endonura quadriseta Cassagnau & Peja, 1979 g
 Endonura saleri g
 Endonura szeptyckii (Weiner, 1973) g
 Endonura tartaginensis Deharveng, 1980 g
 Endonura tatricola (Stach, 1951) g
 Endonura taurica (Stach, 1951) g
 Endonura tetrophthalma (Stach, 1929) g
 Endonura turkmenica Cassagnau, 1979 g
 Endonura tyrrhenica Dallai, 1983 g
 Endonura urotuberculata Pomorski & Skarzinski, 2000 g

Data sources: i = ITIS, c = Catalogue of Life, g = GBIF, b = Bugguide.net

References

Further reading

 
 
 

Springtail genera